The Ahrar al-Jazeera Brigade ("Free Men of al-Jazeera") was a group of Shammar Arab tribesmen that was active during the Syrian Civil War and was instrumental in beginning the operation which resulted in the capture of Yaroubiya in March 2013 (with assistance from other rebel groups). At this point, the unit also assisted anti-Kurdish forces in the Battle of Ras al-Ayn (2012–13). The group was kicked out of Yaroubiya in October 2013 after it was claimed by the al-Nusra Front and the Islamic State of Iraq and the Levant that the group was corrupt.

In 2016, remnants of the group formed the Elite Forces.

See also
List of armed groups in the Syrian Civil War

References

External links

Anti-government factions of the Syrian civil war
Free Syrian Army